The First Missouri State Capitol State Historic Site is a state-owned property in St. Charles, Missouri, preserving the building that served as Missouri's capitol from 1821 to 1826. The site is part of the St. Charles Historic District in the city's Riverfront neighborhood. It was acquired by the state in 1960 and was added to the National Register of Historic Places in 1969.

The First Missouri State Capitol Buildings consists of four connected brick buildings.  They are one room deep with gabled roofs and stone foundations. The first floor of the building was used as a store and residence while the second floor was used by the state government. Both are preserved today.

See also
History of Missouri

References

External links

First Missouri State Capitol State Historic Site Missouri Department of Natural Resources 

Missouri 1821
History museums in Missouri
Museums in St. Charles County, Missouri
Protected areas established in 1960
Missouri State Historic Sites
Government buildings on the National Register of Historic Places in Missouri
Government buildings completed in 1826
Buildings and structures in St. Charles County, Missouri
National Register of Historic Places in St. Charles County, Missouri
1960 establishments in Missouri
Tourist attractions in St. Louis